On 1 November 1956, Hyderabad State ceased to exist; its Gulbarga and Aurangabad divisions were merged into Mysore State and Bombay State respectively. Its remaining Telugu-speaking portion, Telangana, was added to Andhra State. Andhra state formed from Madras state on 1953 oct 1.It's formed new state of  United Andhra Pradesh. After 58 years, the state was bifurcated into Andhra Pradesh and Telangana states on 2 June 2014 by Andhra Pradesh Reorganisation Act, 2014.

Konda Venkata Ranga Reddy was first deputy chief minister of United Andhra Pradesh who was appointed in 1959 under the chief ministership of Neelam Sanjeeva Reddy.

Nimmakayala Chinarajappa & K. E. Krishnamurthy are inaugural Deputy Chief ministers of Andhra, appointed in 2014 under the chief ministership of Nara Chandrababu Naidu

In 2019, Pushpasreevani Pamula first women deputy chief minister hold the post in Andhra Pradesh.

Deputy chief ministers

Deputy chief ministers of Andhra
Keys:

Deputy chief ministers of United Andhra Pradesh
Keys:

Deputy Chief ministers of Andhra State

Andhra State consisted of North Andhra, Coastal Andhra and Rayalaseema regions. This state was carved out of Madras State in 1953. Neelam Sanjeeva Reddy served as deputy CM under Prakasam and Bezawada Gopala Reddy. Later, the Andhra state was merged with Telangana province of Hyderabad to form Andhra Pradesh in November 1956.

Notes

References

Deputy Chief Ministers of Andhra Pradesh
Andhra Pradesh
Deputy Chief